Smenkhkare Imyremeshaw was an Egyptian pharaoh of the mid 13th Dynasty during the Second Intermediate Period. 
Imyremeshaw reigned from Memphis, starting in 1759 BC or 1711 BC. The length of his reign is not known for certain; he may have reigned for five years and certainly less than ten years. Imyremeshaw is attested by two colossal statues now in the Egyptian Museum, Cairo.

Attestations 
Imyremeshaw is attested on the Turin canon, on column 7, line 21 (Alan Gardiner's entry 6.21) as [Smenkh]kare Imyremeshaw. The main contemporary attestations of Imyremeshaw are a pair of colossi dedicated to Ptah "He who is south of his wall, Lord of Ankhtawy" (rsy-ínb=f nb ˁnḫt3wy), a Memphite epithet indicating that the statues must originally have been set up in the temple of Ptah in Memphis. The colossi were later usurped by the 15th Dynasty Hyksos ruler Aqenenre Apepi who had his name inscribed on the right shoulder of each statue with a dedication to "Seth, Lord of Avaris" and had the statues placed in his capital, Avaris. Later, the colossi were moved to Pi-Ramesses by Ramses II who also had his name inscribed on them, together with a further dedication to Seth. Finally, the statues were moved to Tanis during the 21st Dynasty where the colossi remained until the 1897 excavations under the direction of Flinders Petrie. The two statues are now in the Egyptian Museum and are numbered JE37466 and JE37467.

The only other contemporary attestation of Imyremeshaw is a white steatite bead bearing the inscription "The good god, Smenkhkare, beloved of Sobek, Lord of Shedyt". The bead is now in the British Museum, numbered BM EA74185. Although the provenance of the bead is unknown, Egyptologists Darrell Baker and Kim Ryholt propose that the reference to Shedyt, a town close to Memphis, on the bead could indicate that the bead originates from this location.

Finally, W. Davies has proposed that the torso of a statuette discovered in the ruins of a 13th Dynasty pyramid at southern Saqqara and dating "to [a] close successor of Khendjer" may belong to Imyremeshaw. The fragment however is uninscribed and Davies' identification of the owner of the statuette as Imyremeshaw is based solely "on grounds of provenance". The statuette is now in the Egyptian Museum, JE54493.

Name 
The nomen of Imyremeshaw is a well attested name in use during the Second Intermediate Period and  means "Overseer of troops" or "General". For this reason, it has been assumed without further evidence that Imyremeshaw was a general before becoming king. Following this hypothesis, egyptologists Alan Gardiner and William Hayes translated the entry of the Turin canon referring to Imyremeshaw as "Smenkhkare the General", i.e. understanding Imyremeshaw as a title rather than a name. Jürgen von Beckerath proposes that Imyremeshaw was of foreign origin and had a foreign name that could not be understood by the Egyptians and thus became known to them by his military title.
Furthermore, Imyremeshaw did not use any filiative nomina—that is, he was apparently not related to his predecessor Khendjer and certainly of non-royal birth. Thus, scholars suggested that he may have come to power by orchestrating a military coup against his predecessor Khendjer.

Baker and Ryholt contest this hypothesis. They point to the lack of evidence for a military coup as one cannot rule out an usurpation by political means. Additionally, they note that Imyremeshaw was a common personal name at the time. Similar common names based on titles include Imyrikhwe (literally "Overseer of cattle"), Imyreper ("Steward") and Imyrekhenret ("Overseer of the compound"). For these reasons, Stephen Quirke suggests that the name of Imyremeshaw may simply reflect a family tradition and Ryholt adds that it could indicate a family with a military background.

Chronological position and reign length 

The exact chronological position of Imyremeshaw in the 13th Dynasty is not known for certain owing to uncertainties affecting earlier kings of the dynasty. According to the Turin canon, Imyremeshaw was the immediate successor of Khendjer. Baker makes him the twenty-second king of the dynasty, Ryholt sees him as the twenty-third king and Jürgen von Beckerath places him as the eighteenth pharaoh of the dynasty.

The exact duration of the reign of Imyremeshaw is mostly lost in a lacuna of the Turin canon and cannot be recovered, except for the end: "[and] 4 days". Ryholt proposes that the combined reigns of Imyremeshaw and his two successors Sehetepkare Intef and Seth Meribre amount to about 10 years. Another piece of evidence concerning the reign of Imyremeshaw is found in the 13th Dynasty Papyrus Boulaq 18 which reports, among other things, the composition of a royal family comprising ten king's sisters, an unspecified number of king's brothers, three daughters of the king, a son named Redienef and a queen named Aya. Even though the king's name is lost in a lacuna, Ryholt's analysis of the papyrus only leaves Imyremeshaw and Sehetepkare Intef as possibilities. This is significant because the papyrus reports a year 3 and a year 5 dates for this king. Additionally, a date "regnal year 5, 3rd month of Shemu, 18th day" is known from the unfinished pyramid complex neighboring that of Khendjer known as Southern South Saqqara pyramid, which may thus have been built by the same person, perhaps Imyremeshaw.

The exact circumstances of the end of Imyremeshaw's reign are unknown but the fact that his successor Sehetepkare Intef did not use filiative nomina points to a non-royal birth. Consequently, Ryholt proposes that Intef may have usurped the throne.

References

18th-century BC Pharaohs
Pharaohs of the Thirteenth Dynasty of Egypt